

Arthur Finger (18 January 1898 – 27 January 1945) was a German general (Generalmajor) in the Wehrmacht during World War II.  He was a recipient of the Knight's Cross of the Iron Cross of Nazi Germany. Finger was killed on 27 January 1945 near Tschenstochau, Poland during the Soviet Vistula–Oder Offensive.

Awards and decorations

 Knight's Cross of the Iron Cross on 16 November 1943 as Oberst and commander of Artillerie-Regiment 306

References

Citations

Bibliography

 
 

1898 births
1945 deaths
Major generals of the German Army (Wehrmacht)
German Army personnel of World War I
German police officers
Recipients of the clasp to the Iron Cross, 1st class
People from West Prussia
Recipients of the Knight's Cross of the Iron Cross
German Army personnel killed in World War II
People from Toruń